The League for Democracy Party (LDP) is a Cambodian political party which was formed on 15 July 2005. The party itself, however, was established on 26 June 2006. Its leader is Khem Veasna. Its stated goal is to have "A Nation in Which We Live in Equity As Its Owner." Its main mission is to implement the party's "eight Mechanisms" as legal instruments to "reduce the power of the government and bring power
back to the citizens."

History
The League for Democracy Party (LDP) was formed on 15 July 2005 by a small group of people who had similar ideas and perceptions to solve Cambodia's social and political issues.

The founders filed the procedure to establish the League for Democracy Party in accordance with the law and regulations relating to the establishment of political parties.  The LDP was recognized, established, and registered officially with the announcement of the Ministry of Interior, 792 ប្រ.ក. Dated 26 June 2006.

The 2nd LDP Ordinary Congress
Some 5,000 supporters turned out for the congress of the League for Democracy Party in Phnom Penh on Koh Pich (Diamond Island).

Khem Veasna, a former member of the Sam Rainsy Party who founded LDP in 2005, was again endorsed as its leader.

In the 2012 commune council election, LDP won eight commune council seats. This was minor, however, compared to the seats gained by the major parties; from the CPP's 8,000 seats down to the Norodom Ranariddh Party's 52. LDP's tally nonetheless set it apart from the other small parties, all of which won at most one seat."

The party has been steadily growing since it was founded in 2005 and is standing for 2017 election in 844 communes – more than half of the Kingdom’s total 1,646.

Political ideology
The party is considered left wing in its view since it believes that "all" Cambodians must live equally under the laws, as asserted in the party's common dream: "A nation in which we live in equity as its owners".

The eight political mechanisms
The aim of the eight mechanisms as stated by the party are to "reduce, limit, and monitor the power of governments at all levels, whereby the citizens, through unity, maintain control of the governments".
The term of office of the Prime Minister shall be limited by 2 terms (5 years per term) :  This prevent authoritarianism, despotism, or totalitarianism government that gives to exploitation, corruption, and nepotism that greatly affects society and ultimately lead to a failed state.
Prime Minister or any high ranking government officials shall not be allowed to form his/her own security team or bodyguards:  The personal formation of security team can then assimilate to the formation of ambitious self-serving arm-force that can lead to an authoritarian power struggle. Therefore, it does not serve the interest of the citizens.
The Prime Minister shall temporarily make residency, during his/her terms in the executive office, provided by the government of the people:  This is a security measure to safeguard the Prime Minister and immediate family while serving the nation.
Create an administration court.
The role and function as well as the promotion of generals in the military and police should be approved by the Parliament.
The Government Official should be neutral.
There must be people's representation or elected representative at all levels of governments (Commune/Sangkat, District/Khan and Province/City) The representation is to serve the people's voices.
Using of uninominal system to elect the members of Parliament.

General election results

References

External links
League for Democracy Party

2006 establishments in Cambodia
Cambodian democracy movements
Centrist parties in Asia
Labour parties
Liberal parties in Cambodia
Libertarian parties
Political parties established in 2006
Political parties in Cambodia
Populist parties
Progressive parties
Social liberal parties